Chippewa Middle School may refer to:
Chippewa Middle School, in the Okemos Public Schools school district